Rombo  is one of the seven districts of the Kilimanjaro Region of Tanzania. It is bordered to the north and east by Kenya, to the west by the Siha District and Hai District, and to the south by the Moshi Rural District. The Rombo District contains a large portion of Kilimanjaro National Park. According to the 2012 census, the population of the Rombo District was 260,963.

Administrative subdivisions

Wards 
Rombo is divided administratively into 24 wards:

 Aleni
 Holili
 Katangara Mrere
 Kelamfua Mokala
 Keni Mengeni
 Kirongo Samanga
 Kirwa Keni
 Kisale Msaranga

 Kitirima Kingachi
 Mahida
 Makiidi
 Mamsera
 Manda
 Marangu Kitowo
 Mengwe
 Motamburu Kitendeni

 Mrao Keryo
 Nanjara Reha
 Ngoyoni
 Olele
 Shimbi
 Tarakea Motamburu
 Ubetu Kahe
 Ushiri Ikuini

Health 
In Terms of Healthcare facilities, as of 2022 Rombo district is home to 6 health centers and 37 clinics.

References

Districts of Kilimanjaro Region